Friedrich Kremser (born 10 September 1942) is an Austrian retired footballer.

References

External links
 Sturm Archiv

1942 births
Living people
Austrian footballers
Austria international footballers
Association football midfielders
First Vienna FC players